The E. F. Hempstead House is a historic two-and-a-half-story house in Pawnee City, Nebraska. It was built in 1887-1888 for E. F. Hempstead, a banker and businessman. It was designed in the Queen Anne style, with "porch walls faced with imbricated shingles and pierced with vents of open latticework." Moreover, "Columns above support oval shaped openings ending in circular finials at the entries." The house has been listed on the National Register of Historic Places since October 19, 1982.

References

National Register of Historic Places in Pawnee County, Nebraska
Queen Anne architecture in Nebraska
Houses completed in 1888
1887 establishments in Nebraska